Sheela Sharma ( Sheela David) is an Indian film and television actress in Hindi and Gujarati cinema, best known for the films Nadiya Ke Paar (1982), Hum Saath Saath Hain and Mere Yaar Ki Shaadi Hai.
Born in Valsad district, Gujarat, she now lives in Mumbai. After completing her schooling from St Joseph's Convent School, Valsad, she studied at Siddharth College of Law, Mumbai.

She is married to Subhash Sharma, a writer and director, who owns a production house in Mumbai. He is an FTII graduate. Her daughter Madalsa Sharma is also an actress in Indian television.

Filmography

 Sun Sajna (1982)
 Nadiya Ke Paar (1982)
 Abodh (1984)
 Sadaa Suhagan (1986)
 Mai (1989, Bhojpuri)
 Sati Toral (1989, Gujarati)
 Naukar Biwi Ka (1993)
Daraar (1996) as Asha,Nurse
Ghatak (1996)
Yes Boss (1997)
Mann (1999)
Hum Saath-Saath Hain (1999) as Jyoti Anurag Pandey 
Chori Chori Chupke Chupke (2001)
Ajnabee (2001)
Chalo Ishq Ladaaye (2002)
Humraaz (2002 film) (2002)
Raja Bhaiya (2003)
Unns: Love... Forever (2006)
Bhoot Unkle (2006)
Sarhad Paar (2007)
Journey Bombay to Goa: Laughter Unlimited (2007)
Do Knot Disturb (2009)
Kaalo (2010)
Ammaa Ki Boli (2013)
Sathiyo Chalyo Khodaldham (2014, Gujarati)

Television
 Mahabharat (1988) as Devaki
Junoon (1993) as Kajri
 Zee Horror Show (1995) Murti and Kabrastaan
 Madhubala – Ek Ishq Ek Junoon (2013) as Madhubala's mother
 Mata Ki Chowki (2008) as Sheel Kumar's Wife
 CID Episodic Roles
 Naya Nukkad (1993) as Sweetie from Social Club
 Hum Sab Ek Hain (1998) (1998) as Rubina
 2004  Ana as Meena
 Dilli Wali Thakur Gurls as Bhudevi Chachi
 Ajab Gajab Ghar Jamai Special Appearance
 Sanjivani (2019) as Nurse Philo
 Rabb Se Hai Dua'' (2022–present)

References

External links
 

Living people
Indian film actresses
Actresses in Hindi cinema
Actresses in Hindi television
People from Valsad district
Actresses in Bhojpuri cinema
Actresses in Gujarati cinema
Year of birth missing (living people)